Hands On may refer to:

 Hands On USA, now All Hands Volunteers, a relief project established to help victims of Hurricane Katrina
 Hands On Learning Australia, a nonprofit that provides an alternative learning framework for disengaged students to reconnect with school and community
 Hands On (TV series), TV program for deaf and hard-of-hearing people in Ireland
 Hands On (album)